Deathcore is an extreme metal subgenre that combines death metal with metalcore. The genre consists of death metal guitar riffs, blast beats, and metalcore breakdowns. While there are some precursors to the concept of death metal fused with metalcore/hardcore elements seen in the 1990s, deathcore itself emerged in the early 2000s and gained prominence beginning in the mid-2000s within the southwestern United States, especially Arizona and inland southern California, which are home to many notable bands and various festivals.

Some of the genre's earliest examples include Antagony, Despised Icon, and the Red Chord. Deathcore's expansion in the mid-2000s saw bands like All Shall Perish, Through the Eyes of the Dead, Bring Me the Horizon, Suicide Silence, Carnifex, Job for a Cowboy, Chelsea Grin and Whitechapel taking off. In the 2010s, deathcore bands began experimenting with an eclectic selection of other genres.

The genre is noted for its criticism from longtime fans of heavy metal music, usually for its frequent use of breakdowns. Some musicians classified as deathcore have rejected the label.

Characteristics
Deathcore combines death metal characteristics such as blast beats, down-tuned guitars, tremolo picking, and growled vocals with metalcore characteristics such as breakdowns. The genre is usually defined by breakdowns and death metal riffs or metalcore riffs played in the usual death metal tuning. Like in other extreme metal fusion genres, deathcore guitarists down-tune their guitars to give their music a heavier sound. Deathcore bands may also employ guitar solos as well.

Low growls and shrieked screams are common types of vocals in deathcore. Some other techniques that deathcore vocalists have used include what is known as pig squeals. Sung vocals in the genre are rare and most bands seldom if ever use them, but the idea has been experimented with by a few bands such as All Shall Perish (in the song "Awaken the Dreamers") and Oceano (in the song "Incisions").

History

Predecessors (1990s)

The term "deathcore" has had convoluted uses on-and-off in various metal/hardcore scenes far before it was considered an established or recognized genre. The earliest known use of "deathcore" as a word was by New York band N.Y.C. Mayhem, a self-description for their merger of hardcore punk and thrash metal. Outside of the US however, there also existed some early exampled uses; a German deathgrind band named Deathcore existed in the mid 1980s, and another German deathgrind band Blood, used the word as the title for a demo put out in 1986. However it wasn't until 1996 that "deathcore" eventually began gaining traction to describe a musical style; Nick Terry of Terrorizer magazine that year publicized: "We're probably going to settle on the term deathcore to describe the likes of Earth Crisis (as well as the more NYHC-ish but still as deathly Merauder)." Embrace the Eternal (1998) by Embodyment, Yesterday Is Time Killed (1999) by Eighteen Visions, and Rain in Endless Fall (1999) by Prayer for Cleansing are early examples of albums that feature a metalcore sound combined with death metal influences, in 2019 music site The New Fury has even gone on record to credit Embodyment as "[pioneers] of the deathcore genre" due to their performance on Embrace the Eternal. Decibel magazine wrote that death metal band Suffocation were one of the main inspirations for the genre's emergence by writing: "One of Suffocation's trademarks, breakdowns, has spawned an entire metal subgenre: deathcore."

The Belgian H8000 music scene was also influential to the development of the sound, with bands like Deformity, and Liar helping to pioneer a prototype for the genre in the late–1990s and early–2000s. When writing about deathcore pioneers Despised Icon, Dom Lawson of Metal Hammer wrote: "blending death metal with hardcore was by no means a new thing when Despised Icon emerged." Suffocation bassist Derek Boyer says Suffocation "were influenced by many early metal and hardcore bands". Death metal bands like Dying Fetus, Suffocation, and Internal Bleeding were influential on deathcore due to their use of "crushing, mid-paced grooves and breakdowns", according to Lawson.

Origins (early–mid 2000s)
Despite a few earlier metalcore/death metal hybridizations, Antagony and Despised Icon are considered to be the true pioneers of deathcore, however both bands have rejected the label. Antagony founder and frontman Nick Vasallo is credited as being the "father of deathcore" due to his work in the band. The Red Chord is referenced as an early influential source for the genre due to their hybridization of metalcore and death metal sounds (among other genres). New Hampshire band Deadwater Drowning and Californian group All Shall Perish are also seen as notable early entries of the genre. Deadwater Drowning's 2003 EP was remarked as "basically the blueprint for every current deathcore band out today," while All Shall Perish's debut album Hate, Malice, Revenge (2003) is credited as one of the first purist deathcore albums as it "never got tied down to [simply] death metal or metalcore."

In the mid 2000s, deathcore spiked in popularity shortly after Job for a Cowboy released their EP Doom in 2005, which is heavily credited as one of deathcore's most significant and influential releases for the genre. The genre saw an increase in popularity even further when English band Bring Me the Horizon released their deathcore debut full-length Count Your Blessings in 2006. The band were presented the 2006 Kerrang! Award for "Best British Newcomer" shortly after the album's release, however the band abandoned the deathcore genre soon thereafter.

Expansion (late 2000s and 2010s)

Deathcore began to gain further popularity in the mid to late 2000s and early 2010s. Suicide Silence's No Time to Bleed (2009) peaked at number 32 on the Billboard 200, number 12 on the Rock Albums Chart and number 6 on the Hard Rock Albums Chart, while their album The Black Crown peaked at number 28 on the Billboard 200, number 7 on the Rock Albums Chart and number 3 on the Hard Rock Albums Chart. Whitechapel's album This Is Exile sold 5,900 in copies, which made it enter the Billboard 200 chart at position 118. Their self-titled album peaked at number 65 on the Canadian Albums Chart and also at number 47 on the Billboard 200. Their third album A New Era of Corruption sold about 10,600 copies in the United States in its first week of being released and peaked at position number 43 on the Billboard 200 chart.

San Diego natives Carnifex witnessed success with their first album Dead in My Arms (2007), selling 5,000 copies with little publicity. On top of their non-stop touring, the band's methodical songwriting resulted in Carnifex quickly getting signed to label Victory Records. Australian deathcore band Thy Art Is Murder debuted at number 35 on the ARIA Charts with their album Hate (2012), making them the first extreme metal band to ever reach the Top 40 of this chart. Russian deathcore group Slaughter to Prevail reportedly reached over 3.5 million streams on music services for their song "Hell" (2015); the band also performed a line of sold-out shows in China, which made the group the only foreign metal band to perform a sold-out concert in the country in all of 2020.

Fusion with other genres 

A variety of deathcore bands experimented with other genres into their music as influence and time progressed. Emmure has been credited to be heavily influenced by nu metal and was described as "the new Limp Bizkit". Suicide Silence's 2011 album The Black Crown is a deathcore album with some nu metal influences. Other examples of nu metal-inspired deathcore bands include Here Comes the Kraken's later material. The early 2010s saw bands fusing the genre with influences from djent and progressive metal, which began to achieve underground popularity. Examples of the aforementioned include Veil of Maya, Born of Osiris, and After the Burial. Some bands, such as Make Them Suffer and Winds of Plague, mix deathcore with symphonic/classical elements. French band Betraying the Martyrs has been described as "[the] punishing brutality of deathcore with melodic flourishes pulled from symphonic and progressive metal, giving it a theatricality that feels distinctly European."

Criticism

Deathcore has been criticized, especially by longtime fans of other heavy metal subgenres, often because of its fusion of death metal with metalcore and use of breakdowns.

In addition to this, members of certain deathcore bands do not take a liking to being labeled "deathcore". In an interview with vocalist Vincent Bennett of The Acacia Strain about the deathcore label, he said "Deathcore is the new nu-metal. [...] It sucks. And if anyone calls us 'deathcore' then I might do something very bad to them." While in an interview with Justin Longshore from Through the Eyes of the Dead about the deathcore label, he said, "You know, I really hate that term. I know we've been labeled as that but I think there's so much more to our music than just a mixture of death metal and hardcore even though we incorporate those elements in our music. To me it seems that is just the new and fresh thing that kids are following."

In November 2013, Terrorizer wrote, "The term 'deathcore' is usually seen as a dirty word in metal circles" while interviewing vocalist Bryce Lucien of the Texas-based metal band Seeker. Lucien then stated:

In contrast, some bands appear to be more lighthearted and less concerned over being described as deathcore. Scott Lewis of the San Diego-based deathcore band Carnifex stated, "We're not one of those bands trying to escape the banner of deathcore. I know a lot of bands try and act like they have a big problem with that, but if you listen to their music, they are very 'deathcore.' I know that there is a lot of resentment towards deathcore and kind of younger bands." Also, in a 2012 interview, former Chelsea Grin guitarist Jake Harmond said, "Everyone likes to flap their jaw and voice their own opinion how 'embarrassing' it is to be in a band that can be labeled 'deathcore,' but honestly we have never given a fuck".

See also
List of deathcore artists

References

 
Death metal
Metalcore genres
21st-century music genres
2000s in music
2010s in music
Fusion music genres
Extreme metal
Heavy metal genres
American styles of music